Amanda America Dickson (November 20, 1849 – June 11, 1893) was an African-American socialite in Georgia who became known as one of the wealthiest African American women of the 19th century after inheriting a large estate from her white planter father.

Born into slavery, she was the child of David Dickson, a white planter, and Julia Frances Lewis (Dickson), a young enslaved woman of his who was thirteen when her daughter was born. Amanda was raised by Elizabeth Sholars Dickson, her white grandmother and legal mistress. She was educated and schooled in the social skills of her father's class, and he helped her to enjoy a life of privilege away from the harsh realities of slavery before emancipation following the Civil War. In her late 20s, Dickson attended the normal school of Atlanta University, a historically black college, from 1876 to 1878. 

After her father's death in 1885, Amanda Dickson inherited his estate. His white relatives challenged the will but Dickson ultimately won a successful ruling in the case. His estate included 17,000 acres of land in Hancock and Washington counties in Georgia. She married twice: her first husband was white while her second husband was wealthy, educated, and mixed-race.

Early life and education 

Amanda America Dickson was born into slavery in Hancock County, Georgia. Her enslaved mother, Julia Frances Lewis Dickson, was just 13 when she was born. Her father, David Dickson (1809-1885), was a white planter and slave plantation owner who owned her mother; he was one of the eight wealthiest plantation owners in the county. When he was 40 years old, David Dickson had raped 12-year-old Julia Dickson, and she became pregnant. After Amanda was weaned, she was taken from her enslaved mother and maternal grandmother, Rose, to be raised in the household of her white paternal grandmother and mistress, Elizabeth Sholars Dickson. As Amanda grew, her grandmother used her as a domestic servant.

Throughout Amanda's childhood, her father became wealthier and more famous, renowned for his innovative and successful farming techniques. David Dickson showed that farmers could profit from slave labor without having to resort to violence to keep them in submission. By 1861, he was known as the "Prince of Georgia Farmers," having contributed perhaps more than any other farmer in Georgia at that time to the prosperity of the region.

Amanda's father showered her with love and affection. Her mother was a household slave, assigned as David's housekeeper, and she was raped by him, producing Amanda. Dickson’s social status may have enabled the child to live a life of relative privilege while enslaved.

Evidence suggests that David Dickson took charge of Amanda's education. In her white grandmother's household, she learned to read, write, and play the piano, unlike what was permitted for her enslaved relatives. Amanda also learned rules of social etiquette appropriate for the social standing of her father's side of the family. She learned to dress in a modest, elegant fashion and how to present herself as a "lady". Amanda also learned from her father how to conduct business transactions responsibly and how to maintain and protect her finances after marriage.

In 1864, Amanda's grandmother Elizabeth Sholars Dickson died. Amanda and her grandmother Elizabeth had shared a particularly close relationship, with Amanda spending much time in her grandmother's room. Amanda was legally held as Elizabeth's slave until her death. Beginning in 1801, Georgia had prohibited slaveholders from independently freeing their slaves, requiring an act of legislature (seldom given), for each request. Therefore, Elizabeth and David Dickson had no means to manumit Amanda and keep her with them in Georgia until the Thirteenth Amendment to the U.S. Constitution, which abolished slavery and involuntary servitude, was ratified on December 6, 1865. 

At the age of twenty-seven, Amanda chose to leave her father's plantation in Hancock County, Georgia to attend the normal school of Atlanta University, where she studied teaching from 1876 to 1878.

Marriages 

In 1866 at the age of sixteen, Amanda America moved to a small plantation in Floyd County, Georgia near the city of Rome. She married (or lived as if she was married to) Charles Eubanks, a white first cousin and Civil War veteran. Because of anti-miscegenation laws in Georgia at the time, Amanda America and Charles, as an interracial couple, could not legally marry in Georgia. Therefore, they either never officially married, or they married out of state before returning to Georgia (but there is no surviving proof of a legal marriage.) 

They had two sons: Julian Henry (1866–1937) and Charles Green Eubanks (1870–c. 1900). Their mixed-race sons later married prominent members of Georgia society. Julian Henry Eubanks married Eva Walton, the granddaughter of George Walton, who is credited as one of the signers of the Declaration of Independence. Charles Green Eubanks married Kate Holsey, the daughter of Lucius Holsey, a bishop in the Colored Methodist Episcopal Church, and his wife Harriet. After four years of being married to (or living as a married couple with) Charles Eubanks, Amanda left her husband and returned to her father's plantation in 1870, shortly after giving birth to her second son, Charles Green. Charles Eubanks died a few years later on July 31, 1873. David Dickson's  wife, Clara Harris Dickson, died the next day. 

Years after having completed her teaching degree, Amanda America 
married a second time, on July 14, 1892. Her second husband was Nathan Toomer from Perry, Georgia, and she legally was known as Amanda America Dickson Toomer. Nathan Toomer was a wealthy, educated African-American man of her class. He was the child of an enslaved black woman, Kit, and a wealthy white Toomer man who had settled in Houston County, Georgia in the 1850s. As a young man, Nathan had served as the personal assistant to Colonel Henry Toomer, and in that capacity learned the ways of white upper-class gentlemen.  Amanda died on June 11, 1893, eleven months after they were married.

David Dickson's will 
When David Dickson died suddenly on February 18, 1885, Amanda America Dickson inherited the majority of his vast estate, which included 17,000 acres of land. His will left his estate to her "sound judgment and unlimited discretion" and prohibited interference from anyone, including any husband that she may have. In what became known as the David Dickson Will Case, seventy-nine white relatives of David Dickson disputed the will in court, mainly arguing that David Dickson was not of a sound mind when he wrote the will, that he was "unduly influenced" by Amanda America and Julia Dickson, and that Amanda America was not his child.

On July 6, 1885, probate judge R. H. Lewis ruled in favor of the will. In November 1885, the trial in the Superior Court of Hancock County began, with the eventual ruling siding with Amanda America Dickson and her two sons. Then, in March 1886, the white relatives filed their appeal with the Supreme Court of Georgia. On October 11, 1886, chief justice James Jackson, and associate justices Samuel Hall and Mark Blanford heard the case following the appeal. James Jackson expressed his firm conviction against upholding the will, saying, "I would rather died in my place than uphold the will." A few days later he became ill with pneumonia and died. 

Judge Logan E. Bleckley filled his vacancy and refused to hear the case again. Associate justices Samuel Hall and Mark Blanford remained to deliver the ruling regarding whether the white relatives would receive a new trial. Ultimately, eight months later on June 13, 1887, Samuel Hall and Mark Blanford of the Georgia Supreme Court also ruled in favor of Amanda America and her two sons, formally settling the dispute of David Dickson's will. Citing the Fourteenth Amendment to the U.S. Constitution, the Georgia Supreme Court affirmed the lower court's decision, saying that the rights and privileges of a black woman and her children would be the same rights and privileges of a white concubine or an illegitimate white woman and her children. So, the same laws governed the rights and privileges of women of both races.

Life in Augusta, Georgia 

The death of her father, David Dickson, on February 18, 1885, was a pivotal turning point in Amanda America's life. Immediately after his death, she took measures to protect herself legally. Also, in part to distance herself from her disgruntled white relatives whom David Dickson had left out of his will, she moved to Augusta, Georgia, which was a familiar city to her. 

She arrived in Augusta in 1886 and purchased a large, seven-bedroom house at 452 Telfair Street, which was in a multiracial neighborhood. White Georgians generally viewed black citizens within the racial caste system, without regard for wealth or class. But some were willing to accept children of wealthy planters, especially if mostly white. Dickson became a member of the elite black community in Augusta, Georgia. She was held in high esteem by those who came to know her because of her wealth, elegance, and intelligence.

Family ordeal 
Amanda America Dickson spent the last eleven months of her life as the wife of Nathan Toomer, from Perry, Georgia, whom she married on July 14, 1892. Her health was fragile throughout her second marriage, as she had several health problems which required the continual attention of her family physician, Thomas D. Coleman.

By 1893, Amanda America's health had greatly improved, but a disturbing family ordeal would be the catalyst for the further deterioration of her health and eventual death. Her younger son, twenty-three-year-old Charles Dickson, who was married to Kate Holsey, became infatuated with stepsister Mamie Toomer, who was only fourteen years old. On March 10, 1893, Nathan and Amanda brought Mamie to the St. Francis School and Convent in Baltimore, Maryland, an order of black nuns, in an attempt to protect her from Charles Dickson's misguided attentions. Charles Dickson conspired with his brother-in-law Dunbar Walton, his sister-in-law Carrie Walton Wilson, and a hired man, Louis E. Frank, to kidnap Mamie Toomer. Their plan was foiled. Walton, Frank, and their lawyer, E. J. Waring, were indicted by the grand jury of Baltimore, Maryland for conspiracy to kidnap Mamie Toomer. Charles Dickson escaped without any legal ramifications for his actions.

Death 
In June 1893, with the kidnapping drama (involving Mamie Toomer, Charles Dickson, and Charles Dickson's co-conspirators) behind them, Nathan and Amanda America purchased two first-class tickets from a sales representative of the Pullman Palace Car Company to transport them from Baltimore, Maryland back to Augusta, Georgia. Because of racial discrimination, they were denied their first-class accommodations and direct, unimpeded travel to Augusta. The delayed travel to Augusta and the conditions in the Pullman car, most notably the rising temperature, became intolerable for Amanda America. As a result, her health quickly deteriorated. Dr. F. D. Kendall, who examined her on the morning of June 9, 1893, noted that her heart and lungs appeared to be fine, but that she was obviously very nervous and anxious to return home. Dr. Kendall gave her anodyne, a pain-relieving medication.

Nathan and a very ill Amanda America arrived back at their home in Augusta, Georgia between four and five in the afternoon on June 9, 1893. She was quickly tended to by Dr. Eugene Foster, in place of their family physician, Thomas D. Coleman, who was out of town. She was diagnosed with neurasthenia (general exhaustion of the nervous system), or Beard's disease. Symptoms of neurasthenia, as described by nineteenth-century physicians, include "sick headache, noises in the ear, atonic voice, deficient mental control, bad dreams, insomnia, nervous dyspepsia (disturbed digestion), heaviness of the loin and limb, flushing and fidgetiness, palpitations, vague pains and flying neuralgia (pain along a nerve), spinal irritation, uterine irritability, impotence, hopelessness, claustrophobia, and dread of contamination." Amanda America Dickson Toomer died on June 11, 1893, with "complications of diseases" being the cause of death listed on her death certificate.

Amanda America Dickson Toomer's funeral took place at the Trinity Colored Methodist Episcopal Church in Augusta, Georgia. Amanda America died without a will, which resulted in a legal battle after her death for control of her estate. Her mother, Julia Frances Lewis Dickson, and her second husband, Nathan Toomer, both petitioned in court to be designated the temporary administrator of her estate. Ultimately, Julia Dickson, Nathan Toomer, and Amanda America's younger son, Charles Dickson, settled the dispute over Amanda America's estate amicably out of court.

Nine months after Dickson's death, Nathan Toomer married Nina Pinchback, the daughter of P. B. S. Pinchback, the Reconstruction Era senator-elect from Louisiana. On December 26, 1894, they became parents to Jean Toomer. He became known as a Harlem Renaissance writer, noted for his modernist novel Cane (1923).

Representation in popular culture 
A House Divided (2000) is the television movie that depicts the life of Amanda America Dickson. It stars Jennifer Beals as Dickson, Sam Waterston as David Dickson, LisaGay Hamilton as Julia Frances Lewis Dickson, and Shirley Douglas as Elizabeth Sholars Dickson.

References

External link

1849 births
1893 deaths
People from Augusta, Georgia
Atlanta University alumni
19th-century American slaves
American socialites
19th-century American women
Literate American slaves
Free people of color
American women slaves